Boczów refers to the following places in Poland:

 Boczów, Lesser Poland Voivodeship
 Boczów, Lubusz Voivodeship